The Aguano are an indigenous people of Peru.

Aguano may also refer to:

Aguano language, the extinct language of the Aguano people
Ahuano, Ecuador, also called Aguano, a village in Napo Province, Ecuador